Carex lanceolata is a species of sedge (genus Carex), native to the eastern half of China, Mongolia, eastern Siberia, Korea, Sakhalin, and Japan. Its seeds are dispersed by ants.

Subtaxa
The following subspecies are currently accepted:
Carex lanceolata var. lanceolata
Carex lanceolata var. laxa Ohwi
Carex lanceolata var. subpediformis Kük.

References

lanceolata
Plants described in 1857